Shayan Mosleh (born 25 June 1993) is an Iranian professional football player currently playing for Gol Gohar Sirjan in the Persian Gulf Pro League.

Career

Sepidrood Rasht
Mosleh played for Damash Gilan before moving to Sepidrood in summer of 2015.

Persepolis
On 12 June 2017 Mosleh joined Persian Gulf Pro League club Persepolis on a two-year contract.

Career statistics

Club

Honours

Club

Persepolis
Persian Gulf Pro League: 2017–18, 2018–19
Iranian Super Cup: 2017, 2018, 2019
Hazfi Cup: 2018–19
AFC Champions League runner-up: 2018

References

External links

 
 Ali Mosleh on IranLeague.ir
 

Iranian footballers
Living people
1993 births
Esteghlal F.C. players
Sepahan S.C. footballers
Persepolis F.C. players
Sepidrood Rasht players
Damash Gilan players
People from Rudbar
Association football defenders
Sportspeople from Gilan province